The Faraway Drums is a 1981 novel written by Australian author Jon Cleary about an American journalist and British intelligence officer who try to stop the assassination of King George V at the 1911 Delhi Durbar. Film rights were sold but abandoned after it was realised how much an adaptation would cost.

References

External links
The Faraway Drums at AustLit (subscription required)

1981 Australian novels
Fiction set in 1911
Novels set in India
Novels about journalists
William Collins, Sons books
Cultural depictions of George V
Novels by Jon Cleary